The Min Palette, or El Amrah Palette is an ancient Egyptian cosmetic palette from El-Amrah, Egypt (for the Amratian Period), found in Naqada, tomb B62.  It is held in the British Museum, no. 35501.

Description
The Min Palette is a flat slate palette, unadorned, with no iconographic scenes.

Two topics are displayed on the palette. The Symbol of Min, a compound-type hieroglyph arrangement, is centered at the top of the palette, and comprises 1/4 of the palette's front. The other motifs are opposed-facing bird heads on each top corner; the heads are small, with a thin neck, about a tenth the height of the palette, and the right head is damaged.

A small suspension hole is centered on the palette's top.

Min's emblem
The Emblem of Min on the palette is a typographic ligature of two Egyptian hieroglyphs–R23 and S39. The later horizontal form of the Min symbol (hieroglyph), (consisting of two opposing-faced arrows), is shown in an archaic form. Centered vertically overlaying the Min hieroglyph is a vertical "crook" or staff, the version of the 'straight staff',  (see Crook-staff (Luwian hieroglyph)).

See also
List of ancient Egyptian palettes
Cosmetic palette
Min (god)

References

Further reading
Betrò, Maria Carmela.  Hieroglyphics: The Writings of Ancient Egypt, c. 1995, 1996-(English), Abbeville Press Publishers, New York, London, Paris (hardcover)

External links
Photo of Min Palette
Predynastic palette corpus

4th-millennium BC works
Amratian culture
Ancient Egyptian palettes
Egyptian hieroglyphs
Ancient Egyptian objects in the British Museum